Epipyrops poliographa is a moth in the family Epipyropidae. It was described by George Hampson in 1910. It is found in Sri Lanka.

References

Moths described in 1910
Epipyropidae